Have You Heard? is an album by Jack DeJohnette featuring Bennie Maupin, Gary Peacock and Hideo Ichikawa recorded in Tokyo in April 1970 and released on the Milestone label.

Track listing 
All compositions by Jack DeJohnette except as indicated
 "Neophilia (Love of the New) (Bennie Maupin) - 9:52
 "Papa-Daddy" - 19:53
 "Have You Heard?" - 21:26
 "For Jane" - 7:56
Recorded live at Toshi Center Hall, Akasaka, Tokyo, April 7, 1970

Personnel 
 Jack DeJohnette – drums, electric piano, voice
 Bennie Maupin – tenor saxophone, bass clarinet, flute
 Hideo Ichikawa – piano
 Gary Peacock – bass

References 

Jack DeJohnette albums
1970 albums
Milestone Records albums